The 2015 Ethias Trophy was a professional tennis tournament played on hard courts. It was the eleventh edition of the tournament which was part of the 2015 ATP Challenger Tour. It took place in Mons, Belgium between 5 October and 11 October 2015.

Singles main-draw entrants

Seeds

 1 Rankings are as of September 28, 2015.

Other entrants
The following players received wildcards into the singles main draw:
  Germain Gigounon
  Niels Desein
  Maxime Authom
  Clément Geens

The following players received entry using a special exempt into the singles main draw:
  Dennis Novak
  Benjamin Becker

The following players received entry from the qualifying draw:
  Maxime Tabatruong
  Karen Khachanov
  Yannick Mertens
  Maxime Teixeira

The following players received entry as lucky losers:
  Aslan Karatsev
  Sadio Doumbia

Champions

Singles

 Illya Marchenko def.  Benjamin Becker, 6–2, 6–7(8–10), 6–4

Doubles

 Ruben Bemelmans /  Philipp Petzschner def.  Rameez Junaid /  Igor Zelenay, 6–3, 6–1

References

External links
Official Website

 
Ethias Trophy
Ethias Trophy
Ethias Trophy